The United Andhra Pradesh Legislative Assembly election, 1999 was concluded with Telugu Desam Party forming the government once again.

Background
The incumbent chief minister N. Chandrababu Naidu led Telugu Desam Party swept the polls along with Bharatiya Janata Party as part of pre-poll alliance where Naidu agreed to extend his support to the Atal Bihari Vajpayee government in the simultaneous 1999 Indian general election in Andhra Pradesh.The Telugu Desam Party bagged enough numbers i.e 180 seats for the majority and formed the government for another term. N. Chandrababu Naidu was once again invited to form the government by the governor C. Rangarajan The other new parties like  Anna Telugu Desam Party led by Nandamuri Harikrishna and NTR Telugu Desam Party led by Lakshmi Parvathi although managed to split the voting share of the Naidu led Telugu Desam Party but did not gain any single seat in the election.

Incidents 
The polling in the naxal effected Narasaraopet  was concluded with over 60% of voting. People abstained from voting in two booths at Sarangapalli village in response to a poll boycott given by the Naxalites of the banned Peoples War Group (Maoist).

Another incident of bomb blast took place in the same naxal affected constituency. The polling in the constituency, which was scheduled for the first phase on September 5, was postponed after the bomb blast at the residence-cum-nursing home of Panchayat Raj Minister Dr. Kodela Siva Prasada Rao, in which four people including an independent candidate were killed.

Results

Results by party

Results by constituency

References

State Assembly elections in Andhra Pradesh
1990s in Andhra Pradesh
1999 State Assembly elections in India